The U.S. state of Missouri is divided into 1,378 townships in 114 counties.

See also
 List of cities in Missouri
 List of villages in Missouri
 List of counties in Missouri

 
Townships
Missouri